Ivan Fyodorovich (Jan Ignacy) Kenig (1822–1880) was a Polish engineer in the Russian Empire.

1822 births
1880 deaths
Engineers from the Russian Empire